Water transportation is an important means of communication in Bangladesh, a floodplain with approximately 405 rivers and numerous oxbow lakes (locally known as haor). Traditional country boats are still popular and they provide low cost convenient transport in this extensive inland waterways. Approximately 150 types of boats still populate the floodplain, and they vary in design, size and construction materials. They would be either of Bainkata type or of flat bottom type. A bainkata type boat would have a golui fore and a spoon shaped hull whereas a flat bottom type would have neither.

River and boat are central to traditional Bengali culture and they fascinated generations of Bengali artists and poets.

Types 
 Dingi (dinghy)
 Large boats
Sampan, Balam, Teddy, Bajra, Jali
 Bainkata type
Ghasi, jong, gachari, dorakha, kathami, mallar, paloani, patam, panshi and bedi.
 Kosha (flat bottom without golui)
Bhudi, Raptani

Boat making 
Wood is the most commonly used material. Traditionally,  boats are made by carpenters who learned their skill through an apprenticeship. Seasoning of timber is important in boat making. Commonly used timber are from local woods Jarul  (dipterocarpus turbinatus), sal (shorea robusta), sundari (heritiera fomes), and Burma teak (tectons grandis).

Preservation of craftsmanship 
While wooden boats are still frequently used in Bangladeshi country life, they are often mechanized and the intricate craftsmanship in making these boats is, for the most part, underutilized. Very few steps are being taken to preserve these techniques and among them is Friendship, whose cultural preservation sector is working with some of the last master craftsmen of wooden boats in recreating them, along with recording and researching the history and techniques of boat-making. In 2006, Runa Khan Marre of Friendship was awarded a Rolex Award for Enterprise for work in preserving traditional Bengali boat-building skills.

Gallery

See also
 Boat
 Budgerow (bajra))
 Transport in Bangladesh
 List of rivers of Bangladesh
 List of Indian timber trees

References

External links

 Boats of Bangladesh (Video)

Water transport in Bangladesh